V. K. Prakash (born 12 October 1960) is an Indian film director and actor. He makes films, music videos, and commercials, and works predominantly in Malayalam, but has also directed Telugu, Marathi, Kannada and Hindi films. Prakash's debut feature directorial was Punaradhivasam (2000) which won the National Film Award for Best Feature Film in Malayalam and Kerala State Film Award for Best Debut Director. His film Nirnayakam (2015) won the National Film Award for Best Film on Other Social Issues.

Early life
Born in a Malayali family in Palaghat, and currently based in Bangalore, he runs his own ad film production company called Trends Adfilm Makers Pvt Ltd. He studied in the School of Drama, Thrissur before commencing his career in the ad film industry.

Career
V. K. Prakash started as an advertisement film director and worked in the industry for several years. He directed his debut feature film with Punaradhivasam in 2000, a Malayalam drama which won the National Film Award for Best Feature Film in Malayalam and Kerala State Film Award for Best Debut Director for him. In 2015, he directed the social drama Nirnayakam which won the National Film Award for Best Film on Other Social Issues.

Personal life
He is married to Sajitha. The couple have a daughter Kavya.

Filmography

Director

Actor
2022 : Theerppu
2022 : Aquarium
2021 : The Priest (2021 film)
2019 : Manoharam
2019 : Lucifer
2019 : Mikhael
2018 : Ente Mezhuthiri Athazhangal
2018 : B.Tech
2018 : Kuttanadan Marpappa
2018 : Krishnam
2018 : parole
2017 : Sakhavu
2017 : Adventures of Omanakuttan
2016 : Marubhoomiyile aana
2016 : Kali
2015 : Anarkali
2015 : 100 Days of Love
2015 : Vidhooshakan

Awards
National Film Awards
2000: Best Feature Film in Malayalam – Punaradhivasam
2015: Best Film on Other Social Issues – Nirnayakam

Kerala State Film Awards
2000: Best Debut Director – Punaradhivasam

Frequent collaborators
VKP is noted for his particular association with certain actors or using the actors in more of his directorial ventures.

References

External links
 

Malayalam film directors
Living people
Kannada film directors
1960 births
Film directors from Mumbai
21st-century Indian film directors
Indian advertising directors
Directors who won the Best Film on Other Social Issues National Film Award